Imke is a given name. Notable people with the given name include:

Imke Bartels (born 1977), Dutch equestrian 
Imke Courtois (born 1988), Belgian footballer and sports analyst 
Imke David (born 1967), German viol player, author, professor and ensemble-member
Imke Duplitzer (born 1975), German épée fencer
Imke Glas (born 1994), Dutch artistic gymnast
Imke Onnen (born 1994), German high jumper
Imke Vervaet (born 1993), Belgian sprinter